FC Meliorator Zhitkovichi is a Belarusian football club based in Zhitkovichi, Gomel Oblast. The team played in the Belarusian Second League.

History
The club was founded in 2020 and joined the Belarusian Second League the same year.

References

External links
Profile at footballfacts.ru

Football clubs in Belarus
2020 establishments in Belarus
Association football clubs established in 2020